Matthias Buchholz (born 14 December 1957, in Hamburg) is a German violist and professor of viola in Cologne and Geneva.

Biography

Buchholz began his musical training in Hamburg and continued his studies at the University of Cincinnati, in Detmold, and at the Curtis Institute of Music in Philadelphia. He was a laureate of the important prizes at international viola competitions in Bonn (1978), Los Angeles (1981) and Budapest (1984). Since 1976 Buchholz has given concerts as a soloist and in a variety of ensembles such as the American String Quartet and the Auryn Quartet in Europe, North and South America,  and in the Far East. Since 1991, he has been a member of the Linos-Ensemble, recording and touring throughout Europe and Southeast Asia.

From 2003 until 2008 he was a  founding member of the Heine-Quartett, which performed the world premiere of the "Adagio für Streichquartett", dedicated to Robert Schumann by Aribert Reimann  at the Düsseldorfer Schumannfest 2006.

Beginning in 1986, Matthias Buchholz was principal viola with the Stuttgart Radio Orchestra until in 1990 he was appointed professor of viola at the Hochschule für Musik Köln, one of the world's foremost performing arts schools and one of the largest music institutions for higher education in Europe.  Subsequently he has been invited to hold masterclasses in Europe as well as in the U.S., Japan, Taiwan, China and South Korea. In 2013 he was nominated professeur d’alto at the HEM Geneve following Nobuko Imai.

He is a frequent guest recitals and to international concerts and festivals for chamber-music such as Avignon, Cologne, Berlin, Marlboro, Hitzacker, Lyon, Schleswig–Holstein, Ottawa, Salzburg, Mondsee and Russia.

Matthias Buchholz lives in Cologne and is the father of three children.

External links
	List of professors of the Hochschule für Musik, Cologne
	Nomination of Matthias Buchholz HEM Geneve
	Recording
	Linos Ensemble
	Chamber Music Festival Mondsee
	Chamber Music Festival Salzburg
	Hitzacker Festival

German classical violists
1957 births
Living people
Contemporary classical music performers